Mexico competed at the 2015 World Aquatics Championships in Kazan, Russia from 24 July to 9 August 2015.

Medalists

Diving

Mexican divers qualified for the individual spots and the synchronized teams at the World Championships.

Men

Women

Mixed

High diving

Mexico has qualified four high divers at the World Championships.

Open water swimming

Mexico fielded a full team of eight swimmers to compete in the open water marathon.

Men

Women

Mixed

Swimming

Mexican swimmers have achieved qualifying standards in the following events (up to a maximum of 2 swimmers in each event at the A-standard entry time, and 1 at the B-standard):

Men

Women

Mixed

Synchronized swimming

Mexico sent a full squad of twelve synchronized swimmers to compete in each of the following events.

References

External links
Federación Mexicana de Natación 

Nations at the 2015 World Aquatics Championships
2015 in Mexican sports
Mexico at the World Aquatics Championships